Mustansar Hussain Tarar S.I. (born 1 March 1939) is a Pakistani author, travel enthusiast, mountaineer, writer, novelist, columnist, TV host and former actor.

Early life
Mustansar Hussain Tarar was born in Jokalian on 1 March 1939 at his maternal grandparents' house, according to the preface of his book, Lahore Awargi. But he was raised in Lahore with his family that hailed from Mandi Bahauddin. His father, Rehmat Tarar, operated a small agricultural seed store by the name of "Kisan & company" that later flourished to become a major business in that field.

Tarar was educated at Rang Mahal Mission High School and Muslim Model High School, both in Lahore, Pakistan. He pursued higher studies at Government College, Lahore and in London. While abroad he spent much of his time watching movies, hanging out with friends and reading books. In 1958, he attended the World Youth Festival in Moscow and wrote a book named Fakhta (Dove) based on his experience.

Career
He has written more than 50 books including novels and a collection of short stories in his career.
His first book was a travelogue of Europe published in 1971 by the title of Nikley Teri Talaash Main (1970), dedicated to his youngest brother, Mobashir Hussain Tarar. This followed a period during which he travelled in seventeen European countries, and spearheaded a new trend of travelogues in Urdu literature. So far he has over forty travelogues ('Safar Nama' in Urdu) to his credit.

He also became a television actor and was, for many years, a host of Pakistan Television Corporation's (PTV) live morning show Subah Bakhair (1988) (Good Morning). His unconventional and down-to-earth style of hosting earned him great popularity among people from all circles of life. He is one of the most recognised personality among children as he spent a big part of transmission time addressing children exclusively. He called himself chacha jee (paternal uncle) of all Pakistani children and soon became known by this title.

Tarar has been an active mountaineer for many years and has been to the base camp of the famous mountain K2 and the Chitti Buoi Glacier.

Columns as a journalist and books
During his long career, he has been a newspaper columnist and a contributor in Pakistani newspapers including Dawn and Daily Aaj, and used to write a weekly column for Akhbar-e-Jahan.

His books include:
 Mantiqul Tair, Jadeed (منطق الطیر، جدید) (Conference of Birds, Modern) (Publisher: SMP, Language: Urdu, Category: Novel Year: 2018)
 Andulus Mayn Ajnabi (اندلس میں اجنبی) (Stranger in Spain) (ISBN No:9693515471, Publisher:SMP, Language:URDU, Category:	SAFAR NAMA Year: 2009) First published in 1972
 Bahhao (بہاؤ) (Flow)
 Bay Izti Kharab (بے عزتی خراب) (Insulting dishonor) – This phrase is deliberately wrong and commonly used this way in local communities, thus the book name
 Berfeeli Bulandiyan (برفیلی بلندیاں) (Snowy Heights)
 Carvan Sarai (کارواں سرایےؑ) (Caravan Motel)
 Chikh Chuk (چک چک) (Remove the curtain)
 Chitral Daastan (چترال داستان) (Tale of Chitral)
 Dais Huwaa Perdais (دیس ہوے پردیس) (Homeland becomes foreign land)
 Deosai (دیوسائی)- First published in 2003
 Dakia aur Jolaha (ڈاکیا اور جولاھا) (Postman and cloth-maker)
 Gadhay Hamaray Bhai Hain (گدھے ہمارے بھایی ھیں) (Donkeys are our brothers)
 Ghar-e-Hira Mein Ek Raat (غار حراء میں ایک رات) (a night in the cave 'Hira' near Mecca)
 Guzara Naheen Hota (گزارا نہیں ہوتا) (Hard to get by)
 Gypsy (جپسی)
 Hazaron Hain Shikway (ہزاروں ھیں شکوے) (Have thousands of complaints)
 Hazaron Raastay (ہزاروں راستے) (Thousands of paths)
 Hunza Dastaan (ہنزہ داستان) (Tale of Hunza)
 K-2 Ki Kahani (کے ٹو کہانی) (K2 Story)- First published in 1993
 Kaalaash (کالاش) (Kafiristan)
 Khana Badosh (خانہ بدوش) (Gypsi)- First published in 1983
 Moorat (مورت) (Idol)
 Moscow Ki Sufaid Raatein.(ماسکو کی سفید راتیں) ( White nights of Moscow) 
 Munh Wal Kabbey Shariff Dey (منہ ول کعبے شریف دے) (Face towards Qibla) [Experience of performing HAJJ]- First published in 2006
 Nanga Parbat (نانگاپربت) (book named after the mountain of the same name)
 Nepal Nagri (نیپال نگری) (Land of Nepal)- First published in 1999
 Niklay Teri Talash Main (نکلے تیری تلاش میں) (Out in your search)- First published in 1970
 Pakhairoo (پکھیرو) (Birds)- A book in the Punjabi language
 Parinday (پرندے) (Birds)
 Parwaz (پرواز) (Flight)
 Payar Ka Pehla Shehr (پیار کا پہلا شہر) (Love's first city)- First published in 1974
 Putli Peking Ki (پتلی پیکنگ کی) (Monument from Peking)- First published in 2009
 Qilaa Jangi (قلعہ جنگی) (Fortified war)
 Qurbat-e-Marg Main Mohabbat (قربت مرگ میں محبت) (Love, when you are near death)
 Raakh (راکھ) (Ash)
 Ratti Gali- First published in 2005
 Safar Shumal Kay (سفر شمال کے) (Journeys of the north)- First published in 1991
 Shamshaal Baimesaal (شمشال بیمثال) (Extraordinary Shamshaal) First published in 2000
 Shehpar (شہپر) (Wings)
 Shuter Murgh Riasat (شتر مرغ ریاست) (Ostrich State)
 Snow Lake (سنو لیک) First published in 2000
 Sunehri Ullo Ka Shaher (سنہری الو کا شھر) (The city of golden owl)
 Yaak Saraey (یاک سرائے) (Yaak Inn)- First published in 1997
 Khas-o-Khashak Zamane (خس و خاشاک زمانے) (Novel)
 Alaska Highway – ( Publisher: SMP Language: URDU Subject: TRAVELOGUE Year: 2011)
 Australia Awargi (آسٹریلیا آوارگی) (Travelogue, 2015)
 15-Kahaniyan (15 کہانیاں) (Short Stories, 2015)
 Rakaposhi Nagar (راکاپوشی نگر) (Travelogue, 2015)
 America Key Sou Rang (امریکا کے سو رنگ) (Travelogue of America, 2015)
 Aur Sindh Behta Raha (اور سندھ بہتا رہا) (Travelogue of Sindh, 2016)
Haramosh Naqabil e Faramosh (Travelogue of Haramosh peak, 2017)
Karvaan Siraye (کاروان سرائے) (2001 )
Ullu Hamare Bhai Hain (الو ھمارے بھا ئئ ھین)
 Lahore Awargi
 Pyar ka Pehla Punjab
 Siyah Aankh Mein Tasveer
 Tarar Nama

Drama
He is also the author of many famous drama series for Pakistan Television Corporation or PTV.
 Hazaron Raastey (Thousands of Paths)
 Parinda (Bird)
 Shehpar (Wings)
 Sooraj Ke Sath Sath (staying along with the Sun)
 Keilash (Name of a tribe in northern areas of Pakistan)
 Fareb (illusion)

Travelogue writer
As a mountaineer and a travelogue writer himself, Tarar has long promoted the cause of tourism projects in the Northern Areas of Pakistan.

Awards and recognition
Sitara-i-Imtiaz (Star of Excellence) - Awarded in Literature by the President of Pakistan in 2017
Pride of Performance Award - Awarded in Literature in 1992
Anjuman Farogh-i-Urdu (Qatar) Award
Pakistan Academy of Letters PAL nominated him in 2022 for Kamal-e-Fun Award (Lifetime Achievement Award) shared with Ashu Lal Faqeer but he refused to take half award.

See also
Ashu Lal Faqeer

References

External links
Official Website

1939 births
Living people
Government College University, Lahore alumni
Pakistan Television Corporation executives
Pakistani dramatists and playwrights
Pakistani male television actors
Pakistani novelists
Pakistani television hosts
Pakistani travel writers
People from Lahore
Punjabi people
Recipients of the Pride of Performance
Recipients of Sitara-i-Imtiaz
Dawn (newspaper) people
Urdu-language travel writers
Urdu-language novelists